The Symphony No. 4, H. 305, by Bohuslav Martinů was composed in New York City from April 1945, and completed at Martinů's summer home at Cape Cod in June 1945. The finale bears the inscription South Orleans, 14th June, 1945.

The work is in four movements and, according to the composer, grows out of a single motif. The first movement alternates between lyrical and rhythmical material presented in variation. The second movement, in 6/8 time is a Scherzo, marked by a rhythmically irregular Dvořákian leading melody. The slow third movement is dominated by the strings with short passagework for the woodwind. The finale is an energetic reworking of earlier material and concludes with a vibrant tutti.

The work is dedicated to his friends Helen and William Ziegler, and was premiered on 30 November 1945 at the Academy of Music in Philadelphia by the Philadelphia Orchestra under Eugene Ormandy.

Movements
Poco moderato
Scherzo. Allegro vivo. Trio. Moderato
Largo
Poco allegro

Selected discography
Martinů's Fourth Symphony is found amongst the earliest extant recordings of Martinů symphonies in archival holdings. The earliest is Eugene Ormandy's recording of the Second Symphony with the Philadelphia Orchestra, made on 20 January 1945. The Fourth Symphony followed soon after, with aircheck recordings on 78 rpm discs of a broadcast by the Rochester Philharmonic Orchestra conducted by Erich Leinsdorf, on WNBC (New York), 27 March 1948. Neither of these recordings has ever been released commercially. Rafael Kubelik recorded the Fourth Symphony for the radio on 10 June 1948, and this recording was eventually given commercial release in 2012.
 Czech Philharmonic — Rafael Kubelik. Supraphon, recorded 10 June 1948 (first issued 2012)
 Czech Philharmonic — Martin Turnovský. Supraphon, 1967
 Czech Philharmonic — Václav Neumann. Supraphon, 1978
 Royal Liverpool Philharmonic Orchestra — Walter Weller. EMI, 1980
 Bamberg Symphony — Neeme Järvi. BIS, 1987
 Scottish National Orchestra — Bryden Thomson. Chandos CHAN 8917, recorded 6 & 7 September 1989
 Ukrainian National Symphony — Arthur Fagen. Naxos, 2001
 Prague Radio Symphony Orchestra – Vladimír Válek, cond. Bohuslav Martinů: Symphonies Nos. 1–6. Recorded Prague, Czech Radio, Studio A, 2006. 3-CD set. Supraphon SU 3940. Prague: Supraphon, 2008.
 BBC Symphony — Jiří Bělohlávek. Onyx, 2011

Bohuslav Martinů Complete Edition 
In 2015, Sharon Andrea Choa's critical edition of the Symphony No. 4 was published by Bärenreiter within the Bohuslav Martinů Complete Edition.

References

Further reading
 Crump, Michael David. 1986. "The Symphonies of Bohuslav Martinu: An Analytical Study". M.Litt. diss. Birmingham: University of Birmingham.
 Crump, Michael. 2010. Martinů and the Symphony. Symphonic Studies, no. 3. London: Toccata Press. .
 Evans, Peter. 1960. "Martinu the Symphonist". Tempo, new series, nos. 55–56 (Autumn–Winter): 19–26, 31–33.
 Halbreich, Harry. 2007. Bohuslav Martinů: Werkverzeichnis und Biografie, second, revised edition. Mainz, London, Berlin, Madrid, New York, Paris, Prague, Tokyo, and Toronto: Schott. .
 Layton, Robert. 1966. "Martinů and the Czech Tradition". In The Symphony: Vol. II: Elgar to the Present Day, edited by Robert Simpson, pp. 218–29. Harmondsworth: Penguin.
 Llade, Martín. 2009. "Las sinfonías de Bohuslav Martinů". Melómano: Revista de Música clásica 14, no. 144 (July–August): 58–62.
 Powell, Larson. 2007. "Sound as Form: Martinů's Symphonies". Music and Society in Eastern Europe, no. 2 (December): 77–115.
 Rathert, Wolfgang. 2009. "Die Sinfonien von Bohuslav Martinů: Ein Beitrag zur amerikanischen Musikgeschichte?" Musik-Konzepte neue Folge (November, special issue: Bohuslav Martinů), edited by Ulrich Tadday, 113–26. Munich: Edition Text + Kritik.

1945 compositions
Symphonies by Bohuslav Martinů
Music dedicated to family or friends